Natty King, (born Kevin Christopher Roberts; 1977), is a Jamaican roots reggae artist.  He is known for the singles "Mr.Greedy" and "No Guns To Town", both from the 2003 No Guns To Town album. After a short break in his career, King released the 2020 single "JOE". In early January 2022, the roots reggae musician released his second album Rebellution featuring new anthems like: "Trees", "Early Morning" and the title-song of the album "Rebellution".

Life and work 
Born in Jamaica, King grew up in the countryside in Saint Thomas Parish in the southeast of Jamaica. He is the father of four children.

He rose to prominence in the early 2000s. He landed his first hit with the DJ Trinity-produced song "Mr. Greedy", which reached # 1 on the Jamaican charts. His next single "No Guns To Town" debuted at # 1 of the video charts there. After success in Jamaica, he toured through the United States and in Europe in 2003, where he performed at the festivals Rototom Sunsplash (at that time held in Italy, but now in Spain) and the Uppsala Reggae Festival in Sweden.

Music style 
King makes roots reggae with lyrics that predominantly deal with religion (Rastafari), and environmental policy act (Consciousness). His idols are The Wailers, Burning Spear and Luciano.

Awards 
 2003: International Reggae and Word Music Award; category: Best Rural Artist 
 2003: Jamaica Federation Music Award; category: Best New Singer

Discography

Albums
 2003 - No Guns To Town Insight Records 
 2009 -  Trodding
 2010 - Born To Be Free DHF Records; production: House of Riddim
 2022 - Rebellution  Wellowell Production; production: House of Riddim, Natty King

Singles

References

External links 
 
 Natty King at United Reggae 
 Natty King when One Love Peace Festival 
 Natty King at Planet Dread Records
 No Guns To Town at IrieItes.de

Jamaican reggae singers
1977 births
Living people
People from Saint Thomas Parish, Jamaica